Ivar  Bühring Prestbakmo (born 7 November 1968) is a Norwegian politician for the Centre Party.

He served as a deputy representative to the Norwegian Parliament from Troms during the terms 1993–1997 and 1997–2001

On the local level, Prestbakmo served as mayor of Salangen municipality from 1999 to 2014. Since 2006 he chairs the county party chapter.

References

1968 births
Living people
Deputy members of the Storting
Centre Party (Norway) politicians
Mayors of places in Troms